Hoecker is an unincorporated community in northeast Miller County, in the U.S. state of Missouri. The community is on a meander of the Osage River just south of the Miller-Cole county line. Henley is two miles to the west-northwest in Cole County and Meta is six miles to the east in Osage County.

History
A post office called Hoecker was established in 1904, and remained in operation until 1921. James Hoecker, an early postmaster, gave the community his last name.

References

Unincorporated communities in Miller County, Missouri
Unincorporated communities in Missouri